Madan Dhar (date of birth unknown, died 1 March 1978) was an Indian cricketer. He played four first-class matches for Bengal between 1964 and 1966.

See also
 List of Bengal cricketers

References

External links
 

Year of birth missing
1978 deaths
Indian cricketers
Bengal cricketers
Cricketers from Kolkata